The McKinney House is a historic building located on the east side of Davenport, Iowa, United States. William McKinny built this house in 1872 in a neighborhood that was largely populated by Irish immigrants and their descendants. The house remained in the family until after 1900. This house exemplifies a vernacular form of the Greek Revival style that was popular in Davenport. The sunburst design on the porch's pediment is the only decorative element on what is a simple structure. There is also an oculus on the gable end. The house has been listed on the National Register of Historic Places since 1983.

References

Houses completed in 1872
Greek Revival houses in Iowa
Houses in Davenport, Iowa
Houses on the National Register of Historic Places in Iowa
National Register of Historic Places in Davenport, Iowa